Eduardo Vasconcelos (1896 in Oaxaca, Mexico – April 26, 1953) was Governor of Oaxaca from 1947 to 1950. In addition, he was also Secretary of Public Education in 1934 and Secretary of the Interior from 1932 to 1934. In 1872, his grandfather, Francisco Vasconcelos, was elected municipal president of the city of Oaxaca.

References

External links
List of Secretaries of the Interior
List of Mexican State Governors

1896 births
1953 deaths
Governors of Oaxaca
Mexican Secretaries of the Interior
Mexican Secretaries of Education
People from Oaxaca City